This is a collection of lists of flags, including the flags of states or territories, groups or movements and individual people.
There are also lists of historical flags and military flag galleries. Many of the flag images are on Wikimedia Commons.

In Wikipedia

 Gallery of sovereign state flags
 Lists of city flags
 List of flags by design
 List of national flags by design
 List of national flags by aspect ratio
 List of flags by color
 List of flags by number of colors

 Gallery of flags of dependent territories
 Flags of country subdivisions
 Timeline of national flags
 International maritime signal flags
 Lists of naval flags

In Wikimedia Commons

 Gallery of flags by design
 Category:Flags

States or territories
 Extinct states flags
 City flags
 Capital city flags
 Astronomical flags
 Unrecognized states flags

Groups or movements
 Cultural and ethnic flags
 Flags of active autonomist and secessionist movements
 Flags of Native Americans in the United States
 Flags of Aboriginal peoples of Canada
 Flags of French-speaking people of North America
 Political flags
 Religious flags
 International flags
 Sexual identity symbols (including flags)
 Flags of micronations

Personal standards
 Head of state standards

Historical flags

 Historical flags
 Flags of Yugoslavia
 Soviet Republic flags
 Historical flags by country

Military flag galleries
 Flags of the United States Armed Forces

External links
 Flags of the World (FOTW)
 Vexilla Mundi - National and Regional Flags 
 Cyber-flag (french site)
 North American Vexillological Association
 List of Flags in the Flags of the World Database
 The World All Countries National Flags
 Interactive Flag Designs Flag Designs using evolutionary algorithms and search world flags using image similarity
 Car Flag Design
 CIA World Factbook
 Extensive list of similar flags from around the world